Joseph or Joe Berger may refer to:
Joe Berger (born 1982), American football player
Joe Berger (baseball) (1886–1956), Major League Baseball player
Joe Berger (illustrator) (born 1965), English illustrator and cartoonist
Joseph Berger (sociologist) (born 1924), American theoretical sociologist
Joseph Berger (author) (born 1945), author and contributing editor for The New York Times
Joseph Berger (neurologist), American internist and neurologist

See also
Josef Berger (disambiguation)
Joseph Berger-Barzilai (1904–1978), Israeli communist and Comintern member
Joseph Burger (disambiguation)